Virginia's 5th House of Delegates district is one of 100 seats in the Virginia House of Delegates, the lower house of the state's bicameral legislature. District 5 covers all of Grayson County, portions of Smyth County and Washington County, as well as the cities of Bristol and Galax, Virginia. The district is represented by Republican Delegate Israel O'Quinn.

District officeholders

Electoral history

External links
 

005
Grayson County, Virginia
Smyth County, Virginia
Washington County, Virginia
Bristol, Virginia
Galax, Virginia